Rig Kag (also Romanized as Rīg Kag; also known as Rīgak) is a village in Cheraghabad Rural District, Tukahur District, Minab County, Hormozgan Province, Iran. At the 2006 census, its population was 300, in 60 families.

References 

Populated places in Minab County